Julia Ringwood Coston (circa 1863 – June 1, 1931) was a 19th-century Afro-American publisher and magazine editor. In 1891, she founded Ringwood's Afro-American Journal of Fashion, the first illustrated paper for black women.

Early years and education
Coston was born on the Ringwood Farm in the town of Warrenton, Virginia. She received the name "Ringwood" in lieu of a promise her father made to her mother; if their first-born were a girl, she would be named after the farm. Though born in Virginia, Washington D.C. was regarded as her home since she was brought there as an infant. Until the failing of her mother's health causing her to leave school and serve as the family breadwinner, Coston attended public schools until the age of thirteen.

Career

Accepting the position as governess in the family of a general of the United States Army, she found time and received both assistance and encouragement to continue her studies. In the spring of 1886, she married Rev. William Hilary Coston, B. D., then a student at Yale University, the Right Rev. J. M. Brown officiating. Two children were born to them, the older, a girl named Julia R., and the younger, a boy named, W. H. Coston. Mr. Coston was the author of "A Freeman and Yet a Slave".

As a girl, Mrs. Coston felt the ostracism of all the Anglo-Saxon journals of the US as displayed toward anything of interest or credit concerning the colored people; she longed to see a colored face in the pages of a magazine, and to enjoy the privilege of reading about the person. This intense desire culminated in the conception and ultimate execution of Ringwood's Journal. The initial editorial of the journal stated: "Ringwood's Journal of Fashion, published by Mrs. J. R. Coston, makes its advent to satisfy the common desire among us for an illustrated journal of our own ladies. The injury of the absence of the cultivating influence which attaches to a purely published, illustrated journal devoted to the loving interests of our homes, and to the weal of our daughters, was felt by me when a girl, and is recognized by me now when a woman. Knowing that this injury of absence could only be overcome by the presence of such a journal, without measuring the intellectual ability required, we have published Ringwood's Journal".

References

Attribution

Bibliography

External links

American governesses
African-American publishers (people)
American magazine editors
People from Washington, D.C.
American magazine publishers (people)
Women magazine editors
Fashion editors
Year of birth missing
Year of death missing
People from Warrenton, Virginia
19th-century African-American women